Linda J. Scheid (June 16, 1942June 15, 2011) was a Minnesota politician and a member of the Minnesota Senate who represented District 46, which includes portions of the northwestern suburbs of Hennepin County in the Twin Cities metro area. A Democrat, she was first elected to the Senate in 1996, and was re-elected in 2000, 2002, 2006 and 2010. Prior to the 2002 redistricting, the area was known as District 47. She died of cancer on June 15, 2011. Her seat was won in special election on October 18, 2011 by Senator Chris Eaton.

Leadership in the Minnesota House and Senate
Before being elected to the Senate, Scheid served in the Minnesota House of Representatives, representing District 45A from 1977–79, and, after the 1982 redistricting, District 47A from 1983-91. While in the House, she was chair of the General Legislation, Veterans Affairs and Gaming Subcommittee on Elections from 1987-91. She resigned her House seat on November 1, 1991, to become Vice President for Community Affairs with Burnet Realty.

Scheid was a member of the Senate's Commerce and Consumer Protection, Education, and Judiciary and Public Safety committees. She also served on the Rules and Administration Subcommittee for Ethical Conduct. She was chair of the Senate Commerce and Consumer Protection Committee from 2003-11. She was also chair of the Jobs, Energy and Community Development Committee from 2003-05 (called the Jobs, Housing and Community Development Committee during the 2003 session).

Her special legislative concerns included public school funding, property tax reform, parent involvement in student learning, crime prevention, health care, election and ethics issues, jobs and economic development, E-16 education, funding for roads and transit, and business.

Health
In 1999, doctors at the Mayo Clinic discovered a growth on Scheid's left kidney. The growth was removed, along with 20 percent of her kidney. During a checkup in 2005, doctors found another growth in her ovaries and diagnosed her with ovarian cancer. After surgery and chemotherapy, the cancer entered remission, but returned in 2010. In early May 2011, treatments became ineffective, and she decided to stop chemotherapy. She spent her last weeks at home with her family and friends, where she was in hospice care until her death on June 15, 2011, one day before her birthday.

Education and community service
Scheid attended St. Louis Park High School in St. Louis Park, then went on to Coe College in Cedar Rapids, Iowa, where she received her B.A. in German and English. She later attended William Mitchell College of Law in Saint Paul, where she earned her J.D.

After college, Scheid served in the United States Peace Corps, teaching English in Asmara, Ethiopia. She was a member of Brooklyn Park's Minnesota Bicentennial Task Force from 1975-76. She was also a member of the League of Women Voters, the Minneapolis Girls' Club, and the Mrs. Jaycees, of which she was a former state vice president.

References

External links

Senator Scheid Web Page
Minnesota Public Radio Votetracker: Senator Linda Scheid
Project Vote Smart - Senator Linda Scheid Profile

1942 births
2011 deaths
Deaths from cancer in Minnesota
Deaths from ovarian cancer
People from St. Louis Park, Minnesota
People from Brooklyn Park, Minnesota
William Mitchell College of Law alumni
Peace Corps volunteers
Minnesota lawyers
Democratic Party members of the Minnesota House of Representatives
Democratic Party Minnesota state senators
Women state legislators in Minnesota
21st-century American politicians
21st-century American women politicians
20th-century American lawyers
20th-century American Episcopalians
20th-century American women